Molkabad (also Romanized as Molkābād) is a city and capital of Ahmadabad District, in Mashhad County, Razavi Khorasan Province, Iran. At the 2018 census, its population was 2,107, in 302 families.

References 

Populated places in Mashhad County
Cities in Razavi Khorasan Province